Timothy A Stewart (born 30 September 1952) is a molecular biologist. He graduated from the University of Otago (BScHons, PhD.)

Stewart was born in Christchurch, New Zealand. He was a pioneer in the technique of transferring recombinant genes to mice (transgenic mice) and in 1988 he and Philip Leder were granted a patent on a genetically engineered mammal. This "oncomouse" patent was the first to be issued covering a higher life form.

From 1984 to 2003 Stewart was a scientist at Genentech where he developed the concept that the type I interferons might be a significant component in the initiation or progression of type I diabetes.

He has published 61 peer reviewed papers listed in Scopus; the most highly cited has 1013 citations to it, and he has 31 papers with 34 citations or more.

References

1952 births
Living people
New Zealand biologists
University of Otago alumni